Javiera Margarita Odija Ubal Muñoz (28 May 1977 – 16 January 2018) was a Swedish singer with Chilean-Spanish roots who participated in Melodifestivalen twice, in 2000 with Varje timma, var minut, and in 2002 with No hay nada más. She died after having struggled for ten years with anorexia nervosa.

Discography

Albums
Javiera (2001)
True Love (2004)

Singles
Spanish Delight (2001)
No hay nada más (2002)
Will You Remember Me (2002)
Line of Fire (2005)

References

External links

1977 births
2018 deaths
People from Motala Municipality
Swedish women singers
Swedish people of Spanish descent
Swedish people of Chilean descent
Deaths from anorexia nervosa
Neurological disease deaths in Sweden
Melodifestivalen contestants of 2002
Melodifestivalen contestants of 2000